ZFKZ-FM (105.3 FM, "Breeze FM") is a radio station in the Cayman Islands in the British West Indies. The station is also commonly known by its former official branding as Radio Cayman 2. Breeze FM is owned by the Government of the Cayman Islands. It airs a variety format featuring Caribbean music, country music, and middle of the road music.

The station's latest licence was issued on 11 December, 2003. It was amended on 18 October, 2007 to reflect the move of the main Breeze FM transmitter and its Cayman Brac-based translator to the same 105.3 MHz frequency.

Translators

References

External links
Breeze FM official website

1980s establishments in the Cayman Islands
Community radio stations
Radio stations in the Cayman Islands